Stade Henri Desgranges is a stadium in La Roche-sur-Yon, France.  It is currently used for football matches and is the home stadium of La Roche VF.  The stadium holds 10,000 spectators.

External links
Stadium information

Henri Desgranges
Sports venues in Vendée
Sports venues completed in 1939